The Zavodsky constituency (No.103) is a Russian legislative constituency in Kemerovo Oblast. Until 2007 the constituency covered most of upstate northern Kemerovo Oblast, however, in 2015 it was reconfigured to northeastern part of the region, including parts of Kemerovo.

Members elected

Election results

1993

|-
! colspan=2 style="background-color:#E9E9E9;text-align:left;vertical-align:top;" |Candidate
! style="background-color:#E9E9E9;text-align:left;vertical-align:top;" |Party
! style="background-color:#E9E9E9;text-align:right;" |Votes
! style="background-color:#E9E9E9;text-align:right;" |%
|-
|style="background-color:"|
|align=left|Galina Parshentseva
|align=left|Independent
|
|51.09%
|-
| colspan="5" style="background-color:#E9E9E9;"|
|- style="font-weight:bold"
| colspan="3" style="text-align:left;" | Total
| 
| 100%
|-
| colspan="5" style="background-color:#E9E9E9;"|
|- style="font-weight:bold"
| colspan="4" |Source:
|
|}

1995

|-
! colspan=2 style="background-color:#E9E9E9;text-align:left;vertical-align:top;" |Candidate
! style="background-color:#E9E9E9;text-align:left;vertical-align:top;" |Party
! style="background-color:#E9E9E9;text-align:right;" |Votes
! style="background-color:#E9E9E9;text-align:right;" |%
|-
|style="background-color:"|
|align=left|Teymuraz Avaliani
|align=left|Communist Party
|
|20.48%
|-
|style="background-color:"|
|align=left|Igor Kovtun
|align=left|Independent
|
|15.86%
|-
|style="background-color:"|
|align=left|Vladimir Kudeshkin
|align=left|Independent
|
|11.48%
|-
|style="background-color:"|
|align=left|Gennady Dyudyayev
|align=left|Agrarian Party
|
|11.30%
|-
|style="background-color:"|
|align=left|Nina Barabash
|align=left|Our Home – Russia
|
|8.86%
|-
|style="background-color:"|
|align=left|Aleksey Dorovenko
|align=left|Liberal Democratic Party
|
|6.58%
|-
|style="background-color:#E98282"|
|align=left|Galina Parshentseva (incumbent)
|align=left|Women of Russia
|
|5.07%
|-
|style="background-color:#DA2021"|
|align=left|Aleksandr Sergeyev
|align=left|Ivan Rybkin Bloc
|
|4.43%
|-
|style="background-color:"|
|align=left|Aleksandr Tsigelnikov
|align=left|Independent
|
|3.25%
|-
|style="background-color:"|
|align=left|Andrey Sidnev
|align=left|Independent
|
|1.74%
|-
|style="background-color:#1C1A0D"|
|align=left|Vera Podbereznaya
|align=left|Forward, Russia!
|
|1.04%
|-
|style="background-color:"|
|align=left|Igor Goncharov
|align=left|Independent
|
|0.76%
|-
|style="background-color:#000000"|
|colspan=2 |against all
|
|7.54%
|-
| colspan="5" style="background-color:#E9E9E9;"|
|- style="font-weight:bold"
| colspan="3" style="text-align:left;" | Total
| 
| 100%
|-
| colspan="5" style="background-color:#E9E9E9;"|
|- style="font-weight:bold"
| colspan="4" |Source:
|
|}

1999

|-
! colspan=2 style="background-color:#E9E9E9;text-align:left;vertical-align:top;" |Candidate
! style="background-color:#E9E9E9;text-align:left;vertical-align:top;" |Party
! style="background-color:#E9E9E9;text-align:right;" |Votes
! style="background-color:#E9E9E9;text-align:right;" |%
|-
|style="background-color:"|
|align=left|Ivan Ivlev
|align=left|Unity
|
|61.53%
|-
|style="background-color:"|
|align=left|Igor Kovtun
|align=left|Independent
|
|10.41%
|-
|style="background-color:#3B9EDF"|
|align=left|Valentina Proskuryakova
|align=left|Fatherland – All Russia
|
|7.08%
|-
|style="background-color:#7C273A"|
|align=left|Yury Babansky
|align=left|Movement in Support of the Army
|
|4.17%
|-
|style="background-color:"|
|align=left|Gennady Karmanov
|align=left|Independent
|
|3.28%
|-
|style="background-color:"|
|align=left|Yevgeny Artemov
|align=left|Liberal Democratic Party
|
|3.16%
|-
|style="background-color:"|
|align=left|Vladimir Arkhipov
|align=left|Our Home – Russia
|
|0.90%
|-
|style="background-color:#000000"|
|colspan=2 |against all
|
|8.20%
|-
| colspan="5" style="background-color:#E9E9E9;"|
|- style="font-weight:bold"
| colspan="3" style="text-align:left;" | Total
| 
| 100%
|-
| colspan="5" style="background-color:#E9E9E9;"|
|- style="font-weight:bold"
| colspan="4" |Source:
|
|}

2003

|-
! colspan=2 style="background-color:#E9E9E9;text-align:left;vertical-align:top;" |Candidate
! style="background-color:#E9E9E9;text-align:left;vertical-align:top;" |Party
! style="background-color:#E9E9E9;text-align:right;" |Votes
! style="background-color:#E9E9E9;text-align:right;" |%
|-
|style="background-color:"|
|align=left|Andrey Makarov
|align=left|United Russia
|
|72.19%
|-
|style="background-color:"|
|align=left|Valentina Proskuryakova
|align=left|Agrarian Party
|
|8.28%
|-
|style="background-color:"|
|align=left|Artur Pykin
|align=left|Liberal Democratic Party
|
|4.63%
|-
|style="background-color:#164C8C"|
|align=left|Vladimir Kahstanov
|align=left|United Russian Party Rus'
|
|1.39%
|-
|style="background-color:"|
|align=left|Ernest Pislyakov
|align=left|Independent
|
|0.83%
|-
|style="background-color:#000000"|
|colspan=2 |against all
|
|11.36%
|-
| colspan="5" style="background-color:#E9E9E9;"|
|- style="font-weight:bold"
| colspan="3" style="text-align:left;" | Total
| 
| 100%
|-
| colspan="5" style="background-color:#E9E9E9;"|
|- style="font-weight:bold"
| colspan="4" |Source:
|
|}

2016

|-
! colspan=2 style="background-color:#E9E9E9;text-align:left;vertical-align:top;" |Candidate
! style="background-color:#E9E9E9;text-align:left;vertical-align:top;" |Party
! style="background-color:#E9E9E9;text-align:right;" |Votes
! style="background-color:#E9E9E9;text-align:right;" |%
|-
|style="background-color: " |
|align=left|Pavel Fedyayev
|align=left|United Russia
|
|77.50%
|-
|style="background-color:"|
|align=left|Igor Ukraintsev
|align=left|Liberal Democratic Party
|
|8.24%
|-
|style="background-color:"|
|align=left|Yury Vitkovsky
|align=left|Communist Party
|
|6.48%
|-
|style="background-color:"|
|align=left|Yevgeny Mishenin
|align=left|A Just Russia
|
|3.58%
|-
|style="background:"| 
|align=left|Irina Usoltseva
|align=left|Communists of Russia
|
|2.19%
|-
|style="background:"| 
|align=left|Gleb Alshevich
|align=left|Yabloko
|
|1.62%
|-
| colspan="5" style="background-color:#E9E9E9;"|
|- style="font-weight:bold"
| colspan="3" style="text-align:left;" | Total
| 
| 100%
|-
| colspan="5" style="background-color:#E9E9E9;"|
|- style="font-weight:bold"
| colspan="4" |Source:
|
|}

2021

|-
! colspan=2 style="background-color:#E9E9E9;text-align:left;vertical-align:top;" |Candidate
! style="background-color:#E9E9E9;text-align:left;vertical-align:top;" |Party
! style="background-color:#E9E9E9;text-align:right;" |Votes
! style="background-color:#E9E9E9;text-align:right;" |%
|-
|style="background-color:"|
|align=left|Pavel Fedyayev (incumbent)
|align=left|United Russia
|
|71.51%
|-
|style="background-color:"|
|align=left|Olesya Terzitskaya
|align=left|Communist Party
|
|5.36%
|-
|style="background-color:"|
|align=left|Nikolay Teltsov
|align=left|Liberal Democratic Party
|
|4.30%
|-
|style="background-color:"|
|align=left|Yevgeny Kostrov
|align=left|A Just Russia — For Truth
|
|3.85%
|-
|style="background:"| 
|align=left|Galina Stratiyenko
|align=left|Communists of Russia
|
|3.11%
|-
|style="background-color: " |
|align=left|Eduard Kukushkin
|align=left|New People
|
|2.65%
|-
|style="background-color:"|
|align=left|Aleksandr Kalashnik
|align=left|Yabloko
|
|2.20%
|-
|style="background-color: "|
|align=left|Yevgeny Tsvetkov
|align=left|Party of Pensioners
|
|2.15%
|-
|style="background-color:"|
|align=left|Roman Shvets
|align=left|Rodina
|
|1.56%
|-
| colspan="5" style="background-color:#E9E9E9;"|
|- style="font-weight:bold"
| colspan="3" style="text-align:left;" | Total
| 
| 100%
|-
| colspan="5" style="background-color:#E9E9E9;"|
|- style="font-weight:bold"
| colspan="4" |Source:
|
|}

Notes

References

Russian legislative constituencies
Politics of Kemerovo Oblast